De Negen Straatjes is a neighbourhood of Amsterdam, Netherlands located in the Grachtengordel, a UNESCO World Heritage Site.

De Negen Straatjes
De Negen Straatjes comprises nine side streets off the Prinsengracht, Keizersgracht, Herengracht and Singel in central Amsterdam which have been promoting themselves with that name since the 1990s. Together they form a sub-neighborhood within the larger western Grachtengordel, one with many small and diverse shops and restaurants. The construction in this area goes back to the first half of the 17th century. De Negen Straatjes is bordered on the north by the Raadhuisstraat and on the south by the Leidsegracht. In between, the Prinsengracht, Keizersgracht, Herengracht and Singel are intersected by three cross streets - but each of the cross streets has different names in each of its sections between the canals.

From the Prinsengracht towards the Singel and beginning with the northernmost streets, the streets are:

 Reestraat – Hartenstraat – Gasthuismolensteeg
 Berenstraat – Wolvenstraat – Oude Spiegelstraat
 Runstraat – Huidenstraat – Wijde Heisteeg

The names are reminders of many of the types of work that were carried out here in centuries past, especially the processing of skins (cow, bear, wolf and roe deer skins).

History 

Until the end of the 16th century, the city of Amsterdam encompassed the area inside the Singel and what is now Kloveniersburgwal. After the Alteration and change in management, the city expanded in four stages between 1585 and 1665. Around 1612, during the Twelve Years' Truce, the third expansion of the city began with the reclamation of the Grachtengordel (including the area now known as De Negen Straatjes) and the Jordaan between Brouwersgracht en Leidsegracht. The majority of the buildings in De Negen Straatjes date from the 18th century, with little remaining of the original 17th century buildings. There are more than 140 national and municipal monuments in De Negen Straatjes.

The idea to promote the Nine Little Streets as a shopping area came from a few entrepreneurs such as Djoeke Wessing. They wanted a common name for the area and give it a kind of allure as the more notable nearby neighborhood  of Jordaan. This would promote cooperation and business growth, but also attract more tourists to the hitherto relatively unknown area. The Association of The 9 Streets was founded on November 12, 1996. Nobody thought it was a good name at the time, but the name has stuck, and the area retains de 9 Straatjes' name.

Area attractions 
Museum Het Grachtenhuis at Herengracht 386
Photography Museum Huis Marseille on Keizersgracht 401
The European Center for Art, Culture and Science in the Felix Meritis house on the Keizersgracht
The Dutch Institute for War Documentation (NIOD) on the Herengracht

The yearly Prinsengrachtconcert in August takes places at the corner of the Prinsengracht and the Reestraat at Pulitzer Amsterdam.

The "tenth" street 
In recent years the Hazenstraat, a side street off the Elandsgracht in the Jordaan, close to De 9 Straatjes, has called itself the Tenth Street (Dutch: Tiende Straatje).

References

Neighbourhoods of Amsterdam